Megachile leucopogonites is a species of bee in the family Megachilidae. It was described by Moure in 1944.

References

Leucopogonites
Insects described in 1944